Buena Vista Park is a park and/or neighborhood in San Francisco, California

Or it may refer to:
Buena Vista Park, a neighborhood in Severn, Ontario
Buena Vista Park Historic District or its park or neighborhood, in Tulsa, Oklahoma

See also
Buena Vista (disambiguation)